Amitabha Mukhopadhyay (born 5 February 1959) is an Indian cell biologist and a professor at the National Institute of Immunology. He is known for his studies on host-pathogens interaction and drug discovery and is an elected fellow of the Indian Academy of Sciences, and the National Academy of Sciences, India.

Mukhopadhyay, an alumnus of the University of Calcutta from where he earned an MSc, secured a Ph.D. from Jadavpur University after doing his research at the Institute of Microbial Technology. Subsequently, he joined the National Institute of Immunology, India where he holds the position of a professor. He also serves as a visiting scientist at Washington University School of Medicine, and Cornell University Medical School. He has carried out research on the host-parasite interactions of Salmonella and Leishmania, two microbial pathogens. He is reported to have identified the survival mechanisms of salmonella against host macrophages and his work has assisted in widening the understanding of hemoglobin endocytosis in Leishmania, thus assisting in exploring new drug targets for diseases such as typhoid fever and kala azar. His studies have been documented by way of a number of articles and the online repository of scientific articles of the Indian Academy of Sciences has listed 24 of them.

Mukhopadhyay is a recipient of the National Bioscience Award for Career Development of the Department of Biotechnology in 2000. The Council of Scientific and Industrial Research, the apex agency of the Government of India for scientific research, awarded him the Shanti Swarup Bhatnagar Prize for Science and Technology, one of the highest Indian science awards, for his contributions to biological sciences in 2002.

Selected bibliography

See also 

 Plasmodium falciparum
 Leishmaniasis

Notes

References

External links 
 

N-BIOS Prize recipients
20th-century Indian biologists
Indian scientific authors
Living people
Fellows of the Indian Academy of Sciences
Fellows of The National Academy of Sciences, India
Jadavpur University alumni
University of Calcutta alumni
1959 births
Scientists from West Bengal
IIT Kanpur alumni
Recipients of the Shanti Swarup Bhatnagar Award in Biological Science
Indian cell biologists
Washington University School of Medicine faculty
Weill Medical College of Cornell University faculty